Calvin Richardson (born December 16, 1976) is an American R&B and soul singer-songwriter. In 1999, he released his debut solo album Country Boy.

Career
In the mid 1990s, Richardson went solo and signed with Universal Records. His debut album, Country Boy, was released on August 24, 1999, selling 100,000 units. Despite this he was dropped by Universal. Shortly thereafter, he signed a contract with Hollywood Records.

On September 16, 2003, he released his second album, 2:35 PM. The album was given that name because Richardson's child was born at that time, just before completing the album. It featured the minor R&B hit "Keep On Pushin'", a song Richardson wrote and produced by himself. He originally recorded the song "More Than a Woman" a duet with Angie Stone which originally appeared on her 2001 album Mahogany Soul. Richardson would later re-record the song as a solo track for 2:35 pm. An alternate version of the song – which replaces Richardson's vocals with new ones from Joe- was nominated for Best R&B Performance by a Duo or Group with Vocal at the 2003 Grammy Awards. The album also included popular songs such as The Underdogs produced single "Not Like This" as well as the Raphael Saadiq produced "Falling Out". The album was produced by The Underdogs, Jake & Trevor, Young RJ, and Raphael Saadiq.

Richardson then co-wrote and performed on the track "Excuse Me", from Saadiq's 2002 Grammy Award nominated album Instant Vintage, as well as co-writing The Charlie Wilson single produced by Babyface "There Goes My Baby".

Richardson released his third album, When Love Comes, on May 27, 2008, on Shanachie Records. In 2009, he was chosen to record a tribute album to Bobby Womack, which coincided with Womack being inducted into the Rock and Roll Hall of Fame. The Grammy nominated album was entitled, Facts Of Life: The Soul Of Bobby Womack. On August 31, 2010, Richardson released his fifth album, Americas Most Wanted. The lead single was "You're So Amazing".

As of 2013, he has joined the upcoming reality series "Come Back Kings" with Ed Lover, Horace Brown, David "Davinch" Chance (of Ruff Endz), Jeff Sanders, Jameio, Mr. Cheeks and Black Rob.

In January 2014, it was announced that Richardson signed a new deal with Eric Benét's label Jordan House Records with distribution and marketing from the company Primary Wave Music.

In April 2014, Richardson released the first single from his album "I Am Calvin" entitled "We Gon' Love Tonite"."

On September 30, 2014, Richardson released his fifth studio album I Am Calvin on Jordan House/Primary Wave Music/BMG Rights Management.

In January 2015, following the lead single 'We Gon' Love Tonite,' Richardson released the second single from his album 
'Hearsay.'

Artistry

Influences
Richardson cites Babyface as a major influence and someone who has he "learned a lot from". He also cites R. Kelly as someone who he would want to work with, admiring his creativity. Other artists that Richardson says has influenced him are Al Green, Marvin Gaye, Sam Cooke, Bobby Womack, K-Ci Hailey, and Stevie Wonder.

Discography

Studio albums

Awards
Grammy Awards

|-
| align="center" rowspan="2"| 2010
| "Love Has Finally Come At Last"
| Best R&B Performance by a Duo or Group with Vocals
| 
|-
| Woman Gotta Have It
| Best Traditional R&B Performance
| 
|-
| align="center" | 2011
| "You're So Amazing"
| Best Traditional R&B Performance
| 
|-

References

External links

Official website

Calvin Richardson Interview for Soul Jones 2011

1976 births
Living people
African-American  male singer-songwriters
American rhythm and blues singer-songwriters
Singer-songwriters from North Carolina
American neo soul singers
People from Monroe, North Carolina
Universal Records artists
Tommy Boy Records artists
Hollywood Records artists
Shanachie Records artists
Ballad musicians
21st-century African-American  male singers